is a Japanese professional footballer who plays as a goalkeeper for Shimizu S-Pulse and the Japan national team. He also represented the Japan national team at the 2012 Summer Olympics.

Career
Gonda has made 244 appearances in all competitions for current J1 League club FC Tokyo between 2007 and 2016. During that time he has won four honours with Tokyo and two with the Japan national team, with whom he made his full international debut for on 6 January 2010 in a 2011 AFC Asian Cup qualifier against Yemen. He has made 32 appearances at various youth levels for Japan. After nine years with FC Tokyo, Gonda left Japanese football for the first time on 9 January 2016 as he agreed to join Keisuke Honda's Austrian Regional League side SV Horn on loan until 31 December 2016. Gonda return to Japan and Joined to Sagan Tosu in 2017 until he left from the club in 2018. Gonda abroad to Portugal and joined to Portuguese club, Portimonense SC in 2019. Gonda return again to Japan and signed transfer to J1 club, Shimizu S-Pulse from 2021 as loan later permanently transfer after a season at Shimizu due to relegation from top tier in 2022.

Career statistics

Club
.

International

Honours
FC Tokyo
J. League Division 2: 2011
Emperor's Cup: 2011
J. League Cup: 2009
Suruga Bank Championship: 2010

Japan
AFC Asian Cup: 2011; runner-up 2019
EAFF East Asian Cup: 2013

Individual
 AFC Asian Cup Team of the Tournament: 2019

References

External links

Profile at Sagan Tosu

Shūichi Gonda at the Japan National Football Team

Shuichi Gonda – FC Tokyo official site 

1989 births
Living people
Association football people from Tokyo
Japanese footballers
Association football goalkeepers
Japan international footballers
Japan youth international footballers
J1 League players
J2 League players
2. Liga (Austria) players
Austrian Regionalliga players
Primeira Liga players
Liga Portugal 2 players
FC Tokyo players
Portimonense S.C. players
Sagan Tosu players
SV Horn players
Shimizu S-Pulse players
AFC Asian Cup-winning players
Olympic footballers of Japan
Footballers at the 2012 Summer Olympics
2011 AFC Asian Cup players
2013 FIFA Confederations Cup players
2014 FIFA World Cup players
2019 AFC Asian Cup players
Japanese expatriate footballers
Japanese expatriate sportspeople in Austria
Expatriate footballers in Austria
Japanese expatriate sportspeople in Portugal
Expatriate footballers in Portugal
2022 FIFA World Cup players